The Department of Environment was the Government of New Brunswick ministry charged with planning land use, zoning development and waste management as well as the enforcement of environmental legislation and regulations.

It was created in its current form on February 14, 2006 when it was separated from the Department of Environment and Local Government.  It has however existed in this form on previous occasions.

It was first formed by Premier Richard Hatfield when he took office following the 1970 election.  In 2000, then Premier Bernard Lord fused it with the Department of Municipalities to create the aforementioned Department of Environment and Local Government only to split them back in two six years later.

Ministers

1970 - 2000 

* Jardine became Minister of Environment and Local Government

2000 - 2006 
See Department of Environment and Local Government (New Brunswick)

2006 - 2012 

* Holder previously served as Minister of Environment and Local Government

2012 - 2020 
See Department of Environment and Local Government (New Brunswick)

2020 - Present

External links
Department of Environment

Environment
New Brunswick
Defunct environmental agencies
Environmental agencies of country subdivisions
Environmental agencies in Canada
Environmental organizations based in New Brunswick
New Brunswick